Waldow or Waldau, is the name of a Bavarian noble family. The family belonged to the nobility in Nordgau. Originally a Prussian family, they became influential in Brandenburg in the 14th century. The earliest known ancestor is Knight Hentzlinus de Waldow. The family acquired land in Neumark, Meissen, Silesia and Pomerania, where they came to prominence and prestige that they retained until the Second World War.

Notables 

 Adolf Friedrich August von Waldow (1854–1928)—Prussian lieutenant general
 Alexander von Waldow, (1923)—architect and former honorary chairman of the DSU
 Arnold Christoph von Waldow (1672–1743)—Prussian general
 Bernhard von Waldow (1856–1914)—politician, member of the Prussian House of Representatives
 Christian Sigismund von Waldow (1650–1707)—Major General
 Franz von Waldow—chamberlain to the Prussian court
 Eduard von Waldow and Reitsenstein (1796–1873)—Prussian landowner and politician
 Friedrich von Waldow (1854–1917)—Prussian major general
 Friedrich Siegmund von Waldow (1682–1743)—Prussian major general
 Friedrich Siegmund von Waldow
  Johann von Waldow—Bishop of Lebus 1420
 Johann von Waldow (died 1423)—Bishop of Brandenburg and Bishop of Lebus
 Johann von Waldow (died 1424)—Bishop of Lebus
 Karl von Waldow (1828–1896)—German Insurance Manager
 Karl von Waldow and Reitsenstein (1818–1888)—landowner and member of the Reichstag
 Karl von Waldow and Reitsenstein (1858–1945)—landowner and member of the Prussian House of Lords
 Sigismund Rudolf von Waldow (1673–1735)—Prussian major general
 Ulrich von Waldow (1881–1948)—German Lieutenant General in WWII
 Wilhelm August Hans von Waldow-Reitzenstein
 Wilhelm von Waldow (1856–1937)—Prussian politician.
 Wilhelm von Waldow—Secretary of State 6 August 1917.
 Johann V. von Waldow, also known as the Elder—Took part in the Council of Constance. From 1415 to 1420 he was bishop of Brandenburg and from 1421 until his death in 1423 the Bishop of Lebus.
 Johann VI. von Waldow (died 1424), called the Younger—First provost of Berlin and Council of Electors Frederick I. From 1423 to 1424 he was Bishop of Lebus. Both bishops were brothers and come from Königswalde in the Neumark. They were buried in the cathedral at Fürstenwalde.
 Adolph Friedrich von Waldow on Königswalde and Dannenwalde (1725–1801)—canon to Pomerania and 1797 Commendator Johanniter Coming Gorgast

Knights of St John

Commanders and Knights of St John:
 Bastian von Waldow (1608–1682) on Königswalde and Gleissen
 Adolph Friedrich von Waldow (1659–1717) on Königswalde, Gleissen, Dannenwalde
 Baltzer Friedrich von Waldow (born 1665) lieutenant colonel
 Adolph Friedrich von Waldow (1698–1754) on Königswalde, Gleissen and Dannenwalde was Commendatore referencing and privy. 
 Ferdinand Heinrich Thomas von Waldow (1765–1830) Knights of St John, Major and country Marshal.

Prussian army 
 Arnold Christoph von Waldow—hereditary lord on hammer and Költschen (born 1672)
 Friedrich Sigismund von Waldow (1682–1742)—Lord of the Manor on Mehrenthin and Wolgast and Major General. 
 Sigismund Rudolf von Waldow (1673–1735)—Major General
 Karl Wilhelm von Waldow (1777–1836)—Knight of the Iron Cross  Major General.

Politicians
 Eduard von Waldow and Reitsenstein—deputy in the  Reichstag
 Karl von Waldow and Reitsenstein (1818–1888)—Chamberlain of the German Emperor and landowner
 Wilhelm von Waldow (1856–1937)—President of the Upper Province of Posen. In 1917 he was appointed Minister of State and Secretary of War Food Office.

An entry in the Royal Saxon Adelsbuch mentioned Max von Waldow, Prussian Lieutenant Colonel 1905.

References

German noble families